The 1923 Washington & Jefferson Presidents football team was an American football team that represented Washington & Jefferson College as an independent during the 1923 college football season. The team compiled a 6–1–1 record. John Heisman was the head coach.

Schedule

References

Washington and Jefferson
Washington & Jefferson Presidents football seasons
Washington and Jefferson Presidents football